Thomas Henry Tuckey (October 7, 1884 – October 17, 1950) nicknamed "Tabasco Tom", was a Major League Baseball pitcher who played for the Boston Doves in 1908 and 1909.

External links

1884 births
1950 deaths
Major League Baseball pitchers
Boston Doves players
Derby Angels players
Hartford Senators players
New Haven Blues players
Norwich Reds players
Meriden Silverites players
Waterbury Finnegans players
Waterbury Champs players
Lincoln Railsplitters players
Baseball players from Connecticut
Burials at Calvary Cemetery (Queens)